Nigel Quentin Berriman (born 1964) is a Welsh former épée fencer.

He won the British épée national title on six occasions at the British Fencing Championships in 1995, 1996, 1997, 1998, 1999 and 2002. He was captain of both the Welsh and British teams.

References

Living people
1964 births
British male épée fencers